The English ceremonial county of Somerset contains a wide range of museums, defined here as institutions (including nonprofit organisations, government entities, and private businesses) that collect and care for objects of cultural, artistic, scientific, or historical interest and make their collections or related exhibits available for public viewing. Non-profit art galleries and university art galleries are also included, but museums that exist only in cyberspace (i.e., virtual museums) are not.

Many of the museums are in listed buildings. In the United Kingdom, this signifies a building which has been placed on the Statutory List of Buildings of Special Architectural or Historic Interest. In England and Wales, the authority for listing is granted by the Planning (Listed Buildings and Conservation Areas) Act 1990, and is administered by English Heritage. Listed buildings in danger of decay are included on English Heritage's Heritage at Risk Register. There are three types of listed status: Grade I, for buildings "of exceptional interest, sometimes considered to be internationally important"; Grade II*, for "particularly important buildings of more than special interest"; and Grade II, for buildings that are "nationally important and of special interest".

Many of the museums have been accredited by the Museums, Libraries and Archives Council, which sets national standards for museums in the UK. Several are art galleries providing space for the exhibition of art, or are philatelic, regimental, science, aviation, transport, railway, toy, religious or sports museums, but the majority are local museums. There are also several historic house museums owned or managed by the National Trust or English Heritage.

Museums

Defunct museums
 Exmoor Classic Car Museum, Porlock, collection sold in 2012
 Museum of South Somerset, Yeovil, closed in 2011
 Peat Moors Centre, Westhay - was dedicated to the archaeology, history and geology of the Somerset Levels. It also included reconstructions of some of the archaeological discoveries, including a number of Iron Age round houses from Glastonbury Lake Village, and the world's oldest engineered highway, the Sweet Track. The museum closed in 2009 and its status remains uncertain.
 Wincanton Museum, closed in 2011

See also

 Tourist attractions in Somerset

References

External links

Somerset
Lists of buildings and structures in Somerset